Than Uyên is a rural district of Lai Châu province in the Northwest region of Vietnam. As of 2003, the district had a population of 85,908. The district covers an area of 1,630 km². The district capital lies at Than Uyên.

References

Districts of Lai Châu province